A marlock or moort is a shrubby or small-tree form of Eucalyptus found in Western Australia. Unlike the mallee, it is single-stemmed and lacks a lignotuber. It has a dense canopy of leaves which often extends to near ground level.

Marlock species include:
 Bald Island marlock  (Eucalyptus conferruminata or Eucalyptus lehmannii) 
 black marlock, black-barked marlock (Eucalyptus redunca)
 Comet Vale marlock ( Eucalyptus comitae-vallis) 
 flowering marlock, long-flowered marlock, long-leaved marlock  (Eucalyptus macrandra)
 forrest's marlock (Eucalyptus forrestiana) 
 limestone marlock  (Eucalyptus decipiens)
 Quoin Head marlock (Eucalyptus mcquoidii)

Moorts are a form of marlock with smooth, grey bark including the following species:
 moort or round-leaved moort (Eucalyptus platypus)
 red-flowered moort (Eucalyptus nutans)
 Stoate's moort (Eucalyptus stoatei)

References

 
 

Plant morphology
 
Eucalyptus
Myrtales of Australia